The Samsung Galaxy Watch 5 (stylized as Samsung Galaxy Watch5) is a series of Wear OS-based smartwatches developed by Samsung Electronics. It was announced on 10 August 2022, and it was released on 26 August 2022.

Specifications

References

External links 
 

Consumer electronics brands
Products introduced in 2022
Smartwatches
Samsung wearable devices
Samsung Galaxy
Wear OS devices